Tiruchanur railway station (station code: TCNR) is a B-category Indian Railways station in Tiruchanur, Tirupati city of Andhra Pradesh. It is part of Guntakal railway division of South Coast Railway zone. It is situated on the Guntakal–Renigunta section and provides rail connectivity to Tirupati and its suburbs such as Tiruchanur, Tirumala in Tirupati district.

See also 
 List of railway stations in India

References 

Transport in Tirupati
Railway stations in Tirupati district
Railway stations in Guntakal railway division